Ali Brigginshaw (born 1 December 1989) is an Australian rugby league footballer who plays for the Brisbane Broncos in the NRL Women's Premiership and Valleys Diehards in the QRL Women's Premiership.

Background
Born in Ipswich, Queensland, Brigginshaw played her junior rugby league for the North Ipswich Tigers but was forced to give up the sport when she was 12.

Playing career
In 2009, Brigginshaw returned to rugby league, playing for the Souths Logan Magpies. That year, she made her representative debuts for Australia and Queensland.

In 2015, Brigginshaw broke her right fibula in three places. During her recovery she took up Muay Thai and boxing, becoming a national champion and the Australian Golden Gloves Novice A champion in the 69 kg category. In 2016, she returned from injury and played in Queensland 4–8 loss to New South Wales.

2018
In May , she represented South East Queensland at the first ever Women's National Championships.
 In June, Brigginshaw, along with Brittany Breayley, Heather Ballinger, Teuila Fotu-Moala and Caitlyn Moran, were named as the five marquee players for the Brisbane Broncos NRL Women's Premiership team. In August, she was named captain of the side.

On 30 September, she captained the Broncos' in their 34–12 Grand Final win over the Sydney Roosters.

2019
In May, she once again represented South East Queensland at the Women's National Championships. 

On 6 October, she captained the Broncos to their second NRL Women's Premiership after they defeated the St George Illawarra Dragons 30–6 in the Grand Final.

2020
In 2020, Brigginshaw joined Ipswich Brothers for the inaugural season of the QRL Women's Premiership. 

On 19 October, she won the Dally M Medal for female Player of the Year.

2021
In 2021, Brigginshaw joined Valleys Diehards in the QRL Women's Premiership.

Achievements and accolades

Individual
Dally M Medal: 2020
Brisbane Broncos Player of the Year: 2019
Brisbane Broncos Best Back: 2019

Team
2013 Women's Rugby League World Cup: Australia – Winners
2017 Women's Rugby League World Cup: Australia – Winners
2018 NRLW Grand Final: Brisbane Broncos – Winners
2019 NRLW Grand Final: Brisbane Broncos – Winners
2020 NRLW Grand Final: Brisbane Broncos – Winners

Personal life

Brigginshaw proposed to her partner Kate Daly in December 2019 and the couple married a year later, on 30 December 2020.

References

External links

Brisbane Broncos profile

1989 births
Living people
Australia women's national rugby league team players
Australian female rugby league players
Australian Muay Thai practitioners
Australian women boxers
Brisbane Broncos (NRLW) players
Female Muay Thai practitioners
Rugby league players from Ipswich, Queensland